Uberto Gillarduzzi (Alternate spellings: Berto Gillarduzzi, Umberto Gillarduzzi) (17 December 1909 – 8 March 1994) was an Italian bobsledder who competed from the late 1930s to the early 1950s. He won a silver medal in the two-man event at the 1937 FIBT World Championships in Cortina d'Ampezzo.

Competing in two Winter Olympics, he earned his best finish of 12th in the two-man event at Oslo in 1952. In the four-man event he finished 14th.

A family of bobsledders
Brother of two other bobsledders, as him from Cortina d'Ampezzo, Sisto and Guido.

References

External links

1936 bobsleigh four-man results
1936 Olympic Winter Games official report. - p. 415.
1952 bobsleigh four-man results
Bobsleigh two-man world championship medalists since 1931
Uberto Gilarduzzi's profile at Sports Reference.com

1909 births
1994 deaths
Italian male bobsledders
Olympic bobsledders of Italy
Bobsledders at the 1936 Winter Olympics
Bobsledders at the 1952 Winter Olympics